Getaway Plan is a 2017 Spanish crime thriller film directed and written by Iñaki Dorronsoro which stars Alain Hernández, Javier Gutiérrez, Luis Tosar and Alba Galocha.

Plot 
The plot follows Víctor, a criminal who teams up with an Eastern European criminal gang planning to pull a bank heist, hired to break the vault.

Cast

Production 
Produced by LaZona, Runaway Films AIE and Atresmedia Cine in association with ETB, it was shot in Bilbao and Madrid. The score was authored by  whereas Sergi Vilanova took over the cinematography. Mikel Lejarza, Mercedes Gamero and David Naranjo were credited as producers.

Release 
Distributed by Warner Bros, the film was theatrically released in Spain on 28 April 2017.

Reception 
Mirito Torreiro of Fotogramas gave it 3 out of 5 stars, praising the performance of Alain Hernández, while negatively assessing the looks of (predefined) formula of the film.

Reviewing for HobbyConsolas, Raquel Hernández Luján gave the film 66 out of 100 points, deeming it to be a film displaying a good technical workmanship and a screenplay with ups and downs, highlighting the performances (particularly Gutiérrez') and the atmosphere, while considering that the film was dragged by a final stretch making it to fall apart and a "dispensable" and "cliche" sex scene with saxophone.

Writing for Cinemanía, Sergio F. Pinilla gave the film 2.5 out of 5 stars, writing that amid the plot there is a "vaudeville-like" human story (that of Galocha's character) that the film is not able to bring forward "with solvency".

Federico Marín Bellón of ABC gave the film 3 out of 5 stars, deeming it to be a "castizo and powerful" thriller.

See also 
 List of Spanish films of 2017

References

External links 
 Getaway Plan at ICAA's Catálogo de Cinespañol

2017 crime thriller films
Spanish crime thriller films
Films shot in Bilbao
Films shot in Madrid
2010s Spanish-language films
Spanish heist films
Atresmedia Cine films
2010s Spanish films